Up the Chastity Belt (also released as Naughty Knights in the United States) is a 1971 British comedy film directed by Bob Kellett and starring Frankie Howerd. It was a spin-off from the TV series Up Pompeii!

Plot
Eleanor of Aquitaine gives birth to twin sons, Lurkalot first and then Richard. But the nobles, led by Sir Braggart de Bombast, abduct baby Lurkalot and abandon him in a forest to die. He is raised by a family of pigs who belong to Sir Coward de Custard who takes him in as a serf. By way of remittance, Lurkalot aids his master by selling love potions and chastity belts as well as some unusual inventions in the local village, as Sir Coward is not a particularly successful noble. Lurkalot is also visited by strange "voices" in the middle of the night who speak to him and try to tell him who he really is, but get drowned out by events like lightning.

All grown up, Richard is bored of ruling England and decides to go on a crusade. Meanwhile, Sir Braggart de Bombast wants to acquire Sir Coward's lands and daughter for himself and makes him an offer. Sir Coward refuses but invites Sir Braggart and his followers to a banquet so as not to offend them, but refuses to toast Prince John. Offended, Sir Braggart challenges Sir Coward to a duel, with Lady Lobelia as the prize. Lurkalot, although not a knight, takes up the challenge as the "Man with no name" and defeats Sir Braggart's champion, Sir Grumbell de Grunt, with the aid of a giant magnet. Realising that the rules of chivalry have not been met, Sir Braggart declares the duel void and declares war. Lurkalot and Lady Lobelia flee to his workshop where to protect his master's daughter, he locks her up with a chastity belt.

Sir Coward responds to the challenge by running away to join the crusades, whilst Lurkalot, encouraged by his voices, goes to find both him and Richard the Lionheart. Once in the Holy Land, he discovers that the "crusades" are actually a Bacchanalian orgy, an excuse to leave the wives and families for a few years. Saladin is actually a friend of a crusader and started everything. Richard will not leave the Holy Land, as he is with Scheherazade and insists on trying every position in the Kama Sutra. Lurkalot's voices provide inspiration, and he takes all the unused weaponry and fashions them into chastity belts. He then brings feminism to Saladin's women, who go on strike, and Richard is forced to return home.

In Germany, Richard meets a local woman and decides to stay with her. He casually tosses Lurkalot the crown and says that if he looks like him, he can be him. Lurkalot returns home and attempts to rally the people, but he is recognised as Lurkalot and is accused of witchcraft following his earlier escape from the castle where he used his flying machine. After being ducked, he is sentenced to death by burning, but is rescued by Robin Hood. They plan an attack on Sir Braggart and are joined by Sir Coward, who is fed up with being bullied and fortified by smoking from a hookah pipe. Meanwhile, Richard has had to flee to England following an ignoble episode with his German woman and returns to Lurkalot's village, where he is captured by people mistaking him for Lurkalot.

Sir Coward feigns severe illness to get himself and Lurkalot into the castle, where they are incarcerated. He suffers withdrawal symptoms from the loss of his hookah and Lurkalot offers to make him a remedy based on sulphur and charcoal, but spills in saltpetre by accident. He mixes it together, but Sir Coward, who hates taking medicine, throws it in the direction of a fire, where it ignites and blows open the door. Lurkalot calls his new invention "gone powder" and they use it to open the castle gate so Robin Hood can attack. Meanwhile, Sir Braggart duels Lurkalot and reveals that he must be Richard's twin brother. The two battle all over the castle, and he is eventually forced to flee in disgrace. Richard then resumes his rule and everything is right in the land. He agrees to marry Lady Lobelia and makes Lurkalot a knight, but Lurkalot gets Lady Lobelia whilst Richard returns to Scheherazade.

Cast

Production
The film had investment from the Robert Stigwood Organisation.

Music
Eartha Kitt sings "A Knight for My Nights".

Reception
The film was a financial success. It was one of the most popular movies of 1972 at the British box office.

The Radio Times gave the film two out of five stars, finding "few comic highlights to brighten these 'dark ages'".

References

External links 
 
 
 

1971 films
1970s historical comedy films
British historical comedy films
Films shot at EMI-Elstree Studios
Films directed by Bob Kellett
Films scored by Carl Davis
Films based on television series
EMI Films films
1971 comedy films
Films with screenplays by Sid Colin
Cultural depictions of Richard I of England
Crusades films
Robin Hood parodies
Robin Hood films
1970s English-language films
1970s British films